Palangad is a village in the Kozhikode District of Kerala, India.

Palangad is approximately 25 km from Kozhikode (Calicut) city and connected by road through Calicut Medical College and Narikkuni.

There are two schools in Palangad village, A.M.L.P.Palangad and Punnassery A.U.P. School One unaided school run by MES. The famous Palangad pally (Masjid) is situated at Palangad. The pally runs an institution for students with expenses carried out by the believers under the area of this Masjid and management itself. The Puthiyakaavu Sree Bhagavathi temple is situated in Mele Palangad area. Many devotees come here from all parts of Kerala.

Popular attractions in Palangad include the Kuttichathan Para and the Nattikkallu, a large rock 25 meters high. Some ancient caves were found in the border area of Palangad, near to Kuttamboor. A Mixed life of Muslim and Hindu can be seen there.

The places boardering this small village is pannikkotur and kuttamboor. The nearest town is elettil vatooli approximately 3kms.

References

Villages in Kozhikode district
Kozhikode east